The Goner was a psychedelic folk rock band from Sweden. Starting out as a solo project of Daniel Westerlund in 2008, the lineup quickly expanded and over time developed into a six piece live band; playing an eclectic range of instruments including banjo, violin and synths.

The Goner debuted in 2008 with a series of EPs dubbed the H-Trilogy on Daniel Westerlund's own CD-R label Svarta Marknaden: Halartrallar, Hind Hand and Haven.
These limited releases garnered some interest and collectively secured the #1 spot on It's a Trap! Scandinavian Music Journal'''s top album list of 2008.
The following year, Hind Hand and Haven were reissued as the double album HH on US-based label Deep Water Acres.
Featuring The Goner in full band mode, the release of Behold A New Traveler in 2010 drew further attention including a favorable review by Julian Cope, author of Krautrocksampler.

Discography
Releases
 H-Trilogy Halartrallar (Svarta Marknaden, 2008)
 Hind Hand (Svarta Marknaden, 2008)
 Haven (Svarta Marknaden, 2008)
 HH, reissue of Hind Hand and Haven (Deep Water Acres, 2009)
 Behold A New Traveler (Deep Water Acres, 2010)
 Bitemarks EP (Sideways Through Sound, Dying For Bad Music, 2010)

Compilation appearancesDet Grymma Svärdet #5,'' magazine with 10-inch vinyl (Lystring, 2010)  "Backwards Crawl Relay"

References

External links
The Goner Official Site
The Goner on Facebook
The Goner at Dying For Bad Music
The Goner at Deep Water Acres
Early interview at Deep Water Acres
The Goner at Svarta Marknaden
The Goner at It's a Trap! Scandinavian Music Journal
Review of "HH" at Ptolemaic Terrascope Online
Review of "Behold A New Traveler" by Julian Cope

Swedish psychedelic rock music groups
Swedish folk rock groups
Musical groups established in 2008